David Greenberg could refer to:

David Aaron Greenberg (born 1971), American poet, songwriter, artist and art critic
David Greenberg (historian), American historian